Nicholas M. Bayaca Belasco (born December 10, 1973) is a Filipino-American professional basketball player who last played for the Pasig Sta. Lucia Realtors of the Maharlika Pilipinas Basketball League (MPBL). He was drafted 2nd overall by Sunkist in 1997. Born in Stockton, California, he was an import for the Westports Malaysia Dragons in the Asean Basketball League. He was an assistant coach for the Phoenix Pulse Fuel Masters of the Philippine Basketball Association (PBA). He founded the Belasco Unlimited Skills Academy (BUSA).

Early life 
Belasco grew up in Stockton, California, which is home to a large community of Filipinos. Before he came to the Philippines, he had the nickname of "Saint Nic."

Professional career

Sunkist Orange Juicers/Pop Cola Panthers 
Belasco was drafted 2nd overall by Sunkist in 1997. He was traded to the Beermen.

San Miguel Beermen
Belasco was traded along with Dwight Lago and Cris Bolado in exchange for Mythical Team selection Nelson Asaytono and Will Antonio. He has won 8 championships in his PBA career, six of them which he earned with San Miguel Beermen. In the 2004-05 Philippine Cup, he averaged around 17 points, 11.7 boards, 1.34 assists, 0.8 steals, 0.4 blocked shots and 1.8 errors in 37 minutes. This was highlighted by a 30-point performance against his former team.

Alaska Aces 
Belasco was traded along with a second-round pick to Alaska for Brandon Cablay and rookie center Mark Kong  after the 2005-06 Fiesta Conference. He won a championship with the Alaska Aces in the 2007 Fiesta Conference.

Welcoat Dragons
During the 2006–2007 season, Belasco was traded to the Welcoat Dragons for Junjun Cabatu.

Coca-Cola Tigers
On March 8, 2008, Belasco was shipped to the Coca-Cola Tigers in exchange for Mark Isip.

Talk 'N Text Tropang Texters
On August 3, 2009, in a three-way trade involving the Barako Bull Energy Boosters, Talk 'N Text Tropang Texters, and Coca-Cola Tigers, Belasco was shipped to the Talk 'N Text Tropang Texters, Rob Reyes to the Barako Bull Energy Boosters and Larry Rodriguez to the Coca-Cola Tigers.

Sta. Lucia Realtors 
The Texters gave him, Ali Peek, and Pong Escobal to Sta. Lucia in a three-team, eight-player deal.

Westports Malaysia Dragons 
He unretired to be an import for the Westsports Malaysia Dragons.

Powerade Tigers
In June 2012, after the Westports Malaysia Dragons were eliminated by the San Miguel Beermen in the semi-finals of the ABL, he was signed by the Powerade Tigers.

Return to Alaska Aces 
One month later, he returned to the Aces along with Eddie Laure. In 2013, he won his 8th championship when the Aces won the 2013 Commissioner's Cup. 

He was then placed in the 2014 expansion draft where the Kia Sorento picked him. He practiced with the team, but didn't play any games with them. Thus, he was forced into retirement.

Pasig Sta. Lucia Realtors (MPBL) 
Five years after retiring, he returned to playing basketball, this time with the Pasig Sta. Lucia Realtors. He was 45 years old at this time. He played under the "Fil-Am" category.

Coaching career 
After Kia didn't play him, he became the head coach of the Laguna BUSA Warriors. 

In 2016, he became an assistant coach under Ariel Vanguardia for the Phoenix Pulse Fuel Masters. He was tasked with developing their big men, such as Prince Caperal.

Player profile
Belasco was one of the many reliable big men in the league during his playing days. He was a workhorse inside the paint and is a good shooter from the outside. Belasco is also a proven defense specialist.

Personal life 
He is married to Maria Rafaella Verdadero, a former Miss Philippines-Australia and Ms. Binibing Pilipinas-World 2003, since 2004.

After retiring in 2014, Belasco put up the Belasco Unlimited Skills Academy (BUSA) with fellow ex-PBA star Ali Peek. 

After his assistant coaching career, he focused more on his job as the general manager of a sports facility in Makati.

PBA career statistics 

Correct as of February 19, 2022

|-
| style="text-align:left;"| 1997
| style="text-align:left;" rowspan="2"| Pop Cola
| 38 || 31.7 || .468 || .000 || .722 || 6.1 || 1.0 || .5 || .7 || 8
|-
| style="text-align:left;"| 1998
| 52 || 23.3 || .347 || .500 || .606 || 4.5 || .7 || .3 || .7 || 4.8
|-
| style="text-align:left;"| 1999
| style="text-align:left;"| Pop Cola/ San Miguel
| 45 || 32.9 || .437 || .000 || .660 || 6.4 || 1.3 || .4 || .6 || 6.2
|-
| style="text-align:left;"| 2000
| style="text-align:left;" rowspan="5"| San Miguel
| 52 || 32.5 || .530 || .000 || .713 || 7.9 || .8 || .3 || .6 || 7.0
|-
| style="text-align:left;"| 2001
| 70 || 31.7 || .515 || .000 || .776 || 7.0 || .9 || .3 || .4 || 8.4
|-
| style="text-align:left;"| 2002
| 47 || 26.5 || .431 || .361|| .700 || 5.2 || 1.0 || .4 || .3 || 9.3
|-
| style="text-align:left;"| 2003
| 50 || 36.4 || .382 || .272 || .606 || 9.4 || 1.7 || .8 || .3 || 13.2
|-
| style="text-align:left;"| 2004-05
| 78 || 35.5 || .395 || .318 || .746 || 8.9 || 1.8 || .5 || .3 || 12.3
|-
| style="text-align:left;"| 2005-06
| style="text-align:left;"| San Miguel/ Alaska
| 48 || 35.3 || .394 || .349 || .671 || 9 || 2.2 || .9 || .5 || 13.2
|-
| style="text-align:left;"| 2006–07
| style="text-align:left;"| Alaska
| 53 || 31.7 || .373 || .314 || .610 || 7.6 || 1.6 || .4 || .3 || 10
|-
| style="text-align:left;"| 2007–08
| style="text-align:left;"| Welcoat/ Coca-Cola
| 39 || 33.3 || .352 || .314 || .717 || 10.4 || 1.5 || .7 || .4 || 10.8
|-
| style="text-align:left;"| 2008–09
| style="text-align:left;"| Coca-Cola
| 32 || 32.1 || .393 || .265 || .699 || 7.7 || 1.3 || .3 || .3 || 11.8
|-
| style="text-align:left;"| 2009–10
| style="text-align:left;"| Talk 'N Text/ Sta. Lucia
| 34 || 17.6 || .344 || .244 || .639 || 3.8 || .5 || .2 || .3 || 4.3
|-
| style="text-align:left;"| 2011–12
| style="text-align:left;"| Powerade
| 4 || 15 || .444 || .000 || .333 || 5.0 || .3 || .5 || .3 || 2.5
|-
| style="text-align:left;"| 2012–13
| style="text-align:left;" rowspan="2"| Alaska
| 32 || 5.7 || .263 || .200 || .700 || 1.3 || .1 || .0 || .1 || .9
|-
| align=left | 

| 15 || 8.6 || .250 || .100 || .000 || 1.3 ||	.0 ||	.0 ||	.0 ||	1
|-class=sortbottom
| style="text-align:center;" colspan=2 | Career
| 689 || 29.5 || .407 || .302 || .687 || 6.9 ||	1.2 ||	.4 ||	.4 ||	8.7

References

1973 births
Living people
Alaska Aces (PBA) players
American sportspeople of Filipino descent
Basketball players from Stockton, California
Filipino expatriate basketball people in Malaysia
Filipino men's basketball coaches
Filipino men's basketball players
Filipino people of American descent
Notre Dame de Namur Argonauts men's basketball players
Philippine Basketball Association All-Stars
Phoenix Super LPG Fuel Masters coaches
Pop Cola Panthers players
Powerade Tigers players
Power forwards (basketball)
Rain or Shine Elasto Painters players
San Miguel Beermen players
Small forwards
Sta. Lucia Realtors players
TNT Tropang Giga players
Kuala Lumpur Dragons players
American men's basketball players
Pop Cola Panthers draft picks
Maharlika Pilipinas Basketball League players